Dominica competed at the 2019 Pan American Games in Lima, Peru from July 26 to August 11, 2019.

The Dominican team consisted of just two athletes (one of each gender) competing in athletics (track and field). A total of five officials and coaches accompanied the team to the games.

During the opening ceremony of the games, Chef De Mission Brendan Williams carried the flag of the country as part of the parade of nations.

Competitors
The following is the list of number of competitors (per gender) that participated at the games per sport/discipline.

Athletics (track and field)

Dominica qualified two track and field athletes (one per gender). Dillon Simon, did not register a throw in his event, and thus was un-ranked during the shot put competition. On the other hand, triple jumper Thea LaFond finished in eighth place with a best jump of 13.70 metres, therefore registering the country's top result at the games.

Key
Note–Ranks given for track events are for the entire round
NM = No mark

Field events

See also
Dominica at the 2020 Summer Olympics

References

Nations at the 2019 Pan American Games
2019
2019 in Dominica sport